Riley Stearns (born June 29, 1986) is an American filmmaker best known for directing the films Faults (2014) and The Art of Self-Defense (2019).

Early life
Stearns was born on June 29, 1986 in Austin, Texas, and grew up in Pflugerville, Texas. He attended University of Texas at Austin, but dropped out after being turned down by the film program.

Career
Initially wanting to be a musician, Stearns became involved in filmmaking after visiting various movie sets and after being advised on being a screenwriter by Final Destination 3 director James Wong.

Stearns worked as a writer for Cartoon Network's Tower Prep, and for the television series My Own Worst Enemy and Bionic Woman.
His short film The Cub became his first film to be premiered at the 2013 Sundance Film Festival, and also to be featured by Vice Media.

He released his feature debut Faults in 2014. It was later chosen to be part of the Best Unproduced Scripts  Black List of 2013. Stearns wrote and directed a second feature, The Art of Self-Defense, which was released in 2019. In 2022, he released his third feature film Dual.

Personal life
In 2010, he married actress Mary Elizabeth Winstead, whom he met during an ocean cruise in 2002. She starred in his first two short films, before starring in his feature film debut, Faults in 2014.

The couple separated in 2017, and divorced that year after Winstead left him for actor Ewan McGregor.

Stearns is a brown belt in Brazilian Jiu-Jitsu and won a bronze medal at the 2022 ADCC Open in the 70kg Masters Pro division.

Filmography

References

External links
 

Living people
American film directors
American male screenwriters
People from Austin, Texas
People from Pflugerville, Texas
English-language film directors
1986 births